Damanis is a Baloch tribe in the Balochistan region which incorporates regions of Iran, Afghanistan and Pakistan. The majority of Damanis live in the Balochistan, Kerman, Khorasan and Hormongan regions of Iran, and a minority of them live in Eastern Balochistan in Southern Afghanistan and the Chagai District of the Balochistan province of Pakistan. The chief clans of Damanis are Yarahmadzai, Ismailzai and Gamshadzai. 

The Damani tribe is one of the oldest tribes of the Balochis. The Damani are very similar to other Baloch tribes, as they also came from the south of the  Caspian, therefore, they must also be of Parthian origin. 

At the end of the 19th century, the tribe played a significant role in smuggling weapons from the Ottoman Empire to Afghanistan. They also fought against the Seistan Force on the side of Caliph of Ottoman.

References 

Baloch tribes